The Manchurian revival of 1908 was a Protestant revival that occurred in churches and mission stations in Manchuria (now Liaoning Province, China).

It was the first such revival to gain nationwide publicity in China, as well as international repute. The revival occurred during a series of half-day-long meetings led by Jonathan Goforth, a Canadian Presbyterian missionary with the Canadian Presbyterian Mission, who, along with his wife, Rosalind (Bell-Smith) Goforth, went on to become the foremost missionary revivalist in early 20th-century China and helped to establish revivalism as a major element of missionary work. The effect of the revivals in China reached overseas and contributed to some tension among Christian denominations in the United States, fueling the Fundamentalist–Modernist Controversy in the Presbyterian Church in the United States of America.

Beginnings 

In 1907, the Great Pyongyang revival took place in Pyongyang, Korea that involved more than 1000 people during a series of meetings where there was an emphasis of teaching on the work of the Holy Spirit. This influenced revivals in China, including the Manchurian revival of 1908.

Goforth notes a fellow missionary's initial observations of the Manchurian Revival in his book, By My Spirit: 

Goforth arrived in Manchuria in February, 1908, but according to Goforth's account, he "…had no method. I did not know how to conduct a Revival. I could deliver an address and let the people pray, but that was all."

Shenyang 
Goforth held a series of special meetings at Shenyang (Mukden), with some initial opposition from church leaders, there.

After Goforth's address the first morning an elder stood up before all the people and confessed to having embezzled church funds. The effect on the hearers was “instantaneous". One person gave a  “piercing cry" then many, now in tears, began spontaneous prayer and confession. For three days these incidents continued. Goforth recorded,

That year hundreds of members returned to the church fellowship, many of them confessing that they did not think that they had ever really been converted before.

Liaoyang 
Goforth then traveled to hold a series of meetings at the Liaoyang congregation. He wrote:

Guangning 
Goforth proceeded to Guangning (Kwangning) (near Beizhen, Liaoning) where it was told him by another missionary that, "Reports have come to us of the meetings at Mukden and Liaoyang. I thought I had better tell you, right at the beginning, that you need not expect similar results here."

After Goforth had given his sermon, he said to the people:

Spontaneous prayers come forth from several individuals at every meeting, followed by more confessions of sin and wrongdoing among church leaders. Goforth wrote:

Jinzhou 
From the very first meeting that Goforth led at Jinzhou (Chinchow) a renewal movement began to develop. Intense prayer and anxiety to get rid of sin characterized the effect on these believer as it had done at the other mission stations.

Dr. Walter Phillips, who was present at two of the meetings in Jinzhou, wrote:

Xinmin 
The Christians in Xinmin (Shinminfu) had suffered persecution during the Boxer Rebellion of 1900. 54 of the church had been killed and were considered "martyrs" for dying for their faith at the hands of the Boxers. The survivors had prepared a list, containing 250 names of those who had taken part in the massacre. It was hoped by some that revenge would one day be possible. However, after the revival meetings, the list of names was brought up to the front of the church and torn into pieces and the fragments were trampled under foot.

Yingkou 
Goforth ministered at Yingkou (Newchwang), the final resting-place of Scottish missionary William Chalmers Burns. Burns' impact was still being felt 40 years later among the Christian community of Yingkou. However, the same kind of repentance and prayer broke out, here as Goforth wrote:

References

Bibliography 
 Rosalind Goforth,Goforth of China; McClelland and Stewart, (1937), Bethany House, 1986.
 Rosalind Goforth, How I Know God Answers Prayer (1921), Zondervan.
 Ruth A. Tucker, From Jerusalem to Iriyan Jaya; A Biographical History of Christian Missions;  1983, Zondervan.
 By My Spirit (1929, 1942, 1964, 1983)
 Rosalind Goforth, Chinese Diamonds for the King of Kings (1920, 1945)
 Alvyn Austin, Saving China: Canadian Missionaries in the Middle Kingdom, 1888–1959 (1986), chaps. 2, 6
 Daniel H. Bays, Christian Revival in China, 1900–1937
 Edith L. Blumhofer and Randall Balmer, eds., Modern Christian Revivals (1993)
 James Webster, Times of Blessing in Manchuria (1908)
 "Revival in Manchuria," p. 4; published by the Presbyterian Church in Ireland.

Protestantism in China
Christian revivals
History of Christianity in China